Jardas Jerrari is a village in Jebel Akhdar, Libya. It was named Jardas Jerrari after the tribe living on it, and to identify it from Jardas al ‘Abid near Marj. Jardas Jerrari is located about 35 km south of the city of Bayda.

References

See also 
 List of cities in Libya

Populated places in Jabal al Akhdar